The News Chronicle Tournament was a professional golf tournament played in the Brighton area. It was held from 1936 to 1951.

Winners

References

Golf tournaments in England
Recurring sporting events established in 1936
Recurring events disestablished in 1951
1936 establishments in England
1951 disestablishments in England